KSNQ (98.3 FM, "The Snake") is a commercial radio station located in Twin Falls, Idaho. KSNQ airs a classic rock music format.  It is owned by Townsquare Media.

It is a 100 kW Class C1 station.

References

External links
Official Website

SNQ
Classic rock radio stations in the United States
Radio stations established in 2004
Townsquare Media radio stations